Peptoniphilus ivorii is a bacterium from the genus of Peptoniphilus which has been isolated from a leg ulcer.

References 

Bacteria described in 1997
Eubacteriales